Victoriaplatz/Klever Straße is an underground station on the Düsseldorf Stadtbahn lines U78 and U79 in Düsseldorf. The station lies on Klever Straße near Victoriaplatz in the district of Pempelfort, close to the district of Golzheim.

The station was opened on October 3, 1981, and consists of one island platform with two rail tracks.

External links 

 

Düsseldorf VRR stations
Railway stations in Germany opened in 1981